Jonathan Samuel Perlman (born December 13, 1956) is a former Major League Baseball pitcher who played for three seasons. He played for the Chicago Cubs in 1985, the San Francisco Giants in 1987, and the Cleveland Indians in 1988. He played college baseball for Baylor University.

External links

1956 births
Living people
Chicago Cubs players
San Francisco Giants players
Cleveland Indians players
Major League Baseball pitchers
Baseball players from Dallas
Midland Cubs players
Iowa Oaks players
Iowa Cubs players
Phoenix Firebirds players
Williamsport Bills players
Colorado Springs Sky Sox players